Yuri Gagarin is a rock band from Gothenburg, Sweden. Formed in 2012, the band consists of lead guitarist Christian "Crille" Lindberg, rhythm guitarist Jon Eriksson, bass guitarist Leif Göransson, synthesizer player Robin Klockerman, and drummer Stefan "Steffo" Johansson.

History 
Yuri Gagarin were formed in Gothenburg, Sweden at the beginning of 2012. The band began as a three-piece comprising lead guitarist Christian "Crille" Lindberg from Helsingborg, drummer Stefan "Steffo" Johansson from Kungälv, and bass guitarist Leif Göransson from Östersund. Lindberg and Johansson had met in 2001, previously forming a doom band called Stone Serpent. Lindberg specifically decided that he wanted to form a space rock band and approached Johansson & Göransson to be part of it. The band were named after the Russian Soviet pilot and cosmonaut who became the first human in space in 1961. Other names considered for the band were Laika (after the first animal to enter earth's orbit) and Vostok-1 (the spaceflight crewed by Gagarin).

Subsequently, in order to expand the band's sound, synthesizer player Robin Klockerman from Hagfors was added, followed by rhythm guitarist Jon Eriksson from Örebro several months later.

Their first, self-titled studio album was released in October 2013 on Levande Begravd records (who made only 500 physical copies), before being remixed and rereleased by Sulatron records in 2014. Their Sea of Dust EP was then released by Ultraljud records in 2015, followed by their second album, At the Center of All Infinity (released by Kommun2 and Sulatron records), in December of the same year.

Cassette versions of the band's second and debut albums were released by Urtod Void records in 2016 and 2017 respectively. 

The band's third studio album, The Outskirts of Reality, was released in January 2020, through Sound Effect records in Greece and Kommun 2 records in Sweden. The album's artwork was created by artist Påhl Sundström.

Musical style and influences 
Yuri Gagarin incorporates elements of space rock, combined with other genres, such as post-metal and stoner rock. Their music features multiple overlaid guitar tracks and vintage synthesizers, with effects such as analog delay, reverb, echo, and others associated with psychedelic music.

The band's style has been compared to that of groups such as Hawkwind, Neu!, Nektar, Pink Floyd, and Eloy; however, the band does not cite any specific performers as collective influences for their musical style.

Band members

Current members 

 Christian "Crille" Lindberg – lead guitar
 Jon Eriksson – rhythm guitar
 Leif Göransson – bass guitar
 Robin Klockerman – synthesizer
 Stefan "Steffo" Johansson – drums

Discography

Studio albums 
 Yuri Gagarin (2013)
 At the Center of All Infinity (2015)
 The Outskirts of Reality (2020)

Extended plays 

 Sea of Dust (2015)

References

External links 

 Official Yuri Gagarin Bandcamp page

Musical groups established in 2012
Musical groups from Gothenburg
Musical quartets
Space rock musical groups
Swedish progressive rock groups
Swedish psychedelic rock music groups
2012 establishments in Sweden